Live One may refer to:

 Live One (Coil album), 2003
 Live One (Dragon album), 1985
 Live One (Tommy Emmanuel album), 2005
 LiveOne, a music streaming platform, 2007
 Live!! +one, an EP by Iron Maiden, 1980

See also
 Live Ones, or Live in Japan, an album by Harem Scarem, 1996
 A Live One, an album by Phish, 1995
 A Live One (Loudon Wainwright III album), 1979
 The Live One, an album by Greg Brown, 1995